The Flying Lesbians were a seven-woman German music group that existed from 1974 to 1977 and released an eponymous album in 1975. The album was successful, with about 17,000 LPs sold. They were one of the first women's rock groups in Europe.

History 
The Flying Lesbians functioned as a co-operative, wrote lyrics in German and English, and composed all songs by themselves. They also did all their own set up and transported all the equipment for their shows, part of their goal of "being liberated from male assistance." For copyright purposes they worked under the joint pseudonym of "Emily Pankhurst." Their logo was a labrys, a double-headed axe. Their website explains that this is an ancient symbol of women's power throughout Europe.

After forming "over night," according to keyboardist Cillie Rentmeister, they rehearsed twice before they performed their first show to an audience of 2,000 at the first German women's festival in Berlin in 1974:On May 11, 1974, the Berlin Women's Center organized the first public women's festival in West Germany. The Rockfete im Rock (Rock Party in a Skirt, in German, the word Rock also means skirt) was a politically significant event at the time, and men were not admitted. A popular UK band cancelled its performance, and a newcomer band played in its place: The Flying Lesbians had formed a few days earlier and consisted of seven women from the amateur music scene. Their performance was a hit. The Flying Lesbians produced an LP and toured West Germany and Europe in the years that followed. They rocked fiercely through the summer of 1974 - for women only - including a show at the legendary women's camp on the Danish Island of Femø. The band became a role model for several other women bands, including Lysistrara, UnterRock, Schneewittchen, Les-Be-Ton, and Ausserhalb."

This 1974 international women's camp on the Danish island of Femø - with participants from Europe and the US, including Diana E.H. Russell - and the adjoining, big open air women's festival in the Danish Capital Copenhagen were a milestone for the European women's movement. It was here that the impetus and concepts were created for the first "International Tribunal on Crimes against Women" following the "International Women's Year" in Brussels, Belgium in 1976. The Flying Lesbians actively engaged and played in both events, in Copenhagen they played in front of 30,000 festival visitors - this only three months after their founding as a band in Berlin.

During the International Tribunal in Brussels in March 1976, the Flying Lesbians performed twice. Diana E.H. Russell describes the special social function and atmospheric effects of their music for the Tribunal:For many women the most enjoyable events of the Tribunal were two parties on Saturday and Sunday nights. Some coordinating committee members felt that it was important to have some good social times together, and so we had invited The Flying Lesbians, an extremely popular feminist seven-piece rock band from Germany, to play once or twice during the Tribunal. While they were willing to play for free, as they always do for feminist events, they did need their transport costs. Because of our financial situation, we had delayed too long to rent a large enough hail for a party. So we ended up having two parties over the weekend in the far too small women’s center, Maison des Femmes. Hundreds of women, gay and straight, danced exuberantly to The Flying Lesbians’ music, and the crushed conditions didn't seem to bother anyone. In situations where language and cultural differences can so obstruct communication and feelings of solidarity, music, singing, and dance can be much more effective. The Matson [sic; i. e. Maison] des Femmes will never be the same after its first all women dance, and the same is true for some of the partying women.In the years from 1974 until 1977 the Flying Lesbians became the musical "voice of the women's movement". In 1977, Miriam Frank stated in "off our backs":Flying Lesbians is wonderful German, women-made music… The Flying Lesbians are the German women’s movement expressed in music. Each song reflects an important idea, criticism or problem that is being worked out now in the project collectives and women’s centers of West Germany, or that is being argued about in women’s Kneipes (bars) and around communal tables. The record is alive…not only because it is popularly distributed and widely played, but also because it successfully synthesizes ideas and action through music – Rock music…

The blatantly lesbian songs by the Flying Lesbians are surely different from the cozy sweetness of the last few years in American Lesbian music. They’re refreshingly aggressive and controversial. The first song, I’m a Lesbian, How About You is a tight boogy woogy, very danceable, with especially nice piano and guitar work. It’s a lot of fun, and then come the two hard ones... The Flying Lesbians really take off with Frauen kommt her. This song, Women, come on, let’s get it together, united we are strong (transl.) has been sung in the women’s movement for years now, in small groups, at demonstrations, in ever-widening circles, and the Rock setting gives the song a special richness, openness and happiness. It’s the showpiece of the record...

Legacy 
Cillie Rentmeister in several essays reflects on the Flying Lesbians and the function of women's festivals for the women's movement as "Rite of passage" and as "coming out party".<ref>Cf. several essays by Cillie Rentmeister about the Flying Lesbians and the function of women's festivals, e.g. "Sounds of Women’s Movement", The Finland Lectures – held at Helsinki, Sibelius Academy and at University of Jyväskylä, Dept. of Music, Art and Culture Studies, 1985 full illustrated version; further on feministberlin1968ff (historical website on the German women's movement in Berlin, by Cristina Perincioli, English version) with Rentmeisters essay 1974 - Flying Lesbians, Feminist Festivals, Women's Festivals", shortened English version, with illustrations </ref> Bassist Monika Savier has been quoted as saying that most of the band openly identified as lesbians, which helped fans to feel comfortable coming out, but the band never distanced themselves from heterosexual women. The Flying Lesbians performed in a stage revival in autumn 2007.

The Flying Lesbians were also represented at exhibitions such as "Homosexualitaet_en" (Homosexualities), a double exhibition in the Schwules Museum "Gay Museum" and the "Deutsches Historisches Museum" in Berlin 2015, - the first representative exhibition in Germany also in relation to the prominent official locations as well as the comprehensive claim and content: "Covering a total area of 1600 square meters, “Homosexuality_ies” documents 150 years of the history, politics and culture of homosexual women and men in Germany..." An audio station for songs of the Flying Lesbians was also set up at the exhibition.

Members
The seven members of the band were:
Danielle de Baat: guitar, bass guitar, vocals
Monika Jaeckel: vocals, percussion († 2009)
Gigi (Christa) Lansch: drums 1975 ff. († 2002)
Monika Mengel: vocals, percussion
Cillie Rentmeister: piano, vocals, harmonica, synthesizer
Monika Savier: bass guitar, percussion
Christel Wachowski: guitar, percussion
Swetlana Freifrau von dem Bottlenberg: vocals, drums 1974-1975 (Swetlana became a member of the NDW band Cora with Cora Von Dem Bottlenberg in the 1980s)

Album
Their 1975 album was re-released as a CD in 2007. All lyrics and audiotracks of the songs are available on the band's website.

References

Further reading
English section of official website Includes text of Cillie Rentmeister's 1985 lecture "The Sounds of the Women’s Movement - Women’s Rock Bands in Germany (1974 – 1985)" describing history of the bandExternal links
 Includes biographies of members, under "die band"''

German rock music groups
All-female bands
German feminists
LGBT-themed musical groups
Musical groups established in 1974
Musical groups disestablished in 1977
Feminist musicians
Feminist art organizations
Feminist organisations in Germany